Festival of Lights is a 2010 film directed and written by Shundell Prasad. It stars Melinda Shankar as the rebellious and mouthy Reshma, Jimi Mistry as Reshma's birth father, and Aidan Quinn as Reshma's stepfather. The film deals with Reshma's struggles to find her father whom she was separated from when she and her mother, played by Ritu Singh Pande, migrate from Guyana to New York City.

Plot
Separated from her father when their family immigrates from Guyana, a young girl comes of age in New York City. Battling through a troubled youth and a broken relationship with her mother, she struggles to find peace and discover the secret of what happened to her father.

Cast
Melinda Shankar as Reshma
Jimi Mistry as Vishnu, Reshma's father
Aidan Quinn as Adem, Reshma's stepfather
Ritu Singh Pande as Meena, Reshma's mother
Stephen Hadeed, Jr. as Ravin
Nandanie Dudhnath as Asha
Isabella A. Santos as Sandy
Fawad Siddiqui as Mike, Reshma's uncle
Dion Matthews as Warden's Assistant

Production
The film was directed, written and co-produced by Shundell Prasad. It was filmed in Georgetown, Guyana and Queens, New York.

External links
 
 

2010 films
American coming-of-age drama films
2010s coming-of-age drama films
Films set in Guyana
American rape and revenge films
Films about rebels
2010 drama films
2010s English-language films
2010s American films